Leon Bell may refer to:

 Leon Lalite (born 1980), previously known as Leon Bell, English footballer
 Leon Bell Bell (born 1996), German footballer